The Al-Kauthar Mosque ( or also known as Masjid Besar Tawau) is a mosque in Tawau, Sabah, Malaysia.

Built in 1997 and completed in 2002, it is the largest mosque in the state of Sabah, with a capacity that can accommodate from 16,000 to 17,000 people. The mosque was officially opened in 2004, officiated by the Yang di-Pertuan Agong at the time, Syed Sirajuddin Tuanku Syed Putra Jamalullail.

See also
 Islam in Malaysia

References

External links 
 
 Al-Kauthar Mosque information on IslamGRID: 2.0

2002 establishments in Malaysia
Mosques in Sabah
Mosques completed in 2002
Mosque buildings with domes
Tawau